Anatol Ciobanu (14 May 1934 – 8 April 2016) was a Moldovan professor and researcher. He was head of the Department of Romanian language at Moldova State University, a corresponding member of the Academy of Sciences of Moldova, and a leader of the Democratic Forum of Romanians in Moldova.

Biography
Anatol Ciobanu was born on May 14, 1934, in Ruseni. He graduated from Moldova State University in 1956 and since 1959 he has been working for this university. Anatol Ciobanu got his PhD in 1973. Since 2001, he has been the head of the Department of Romanian language, general linguistics and Romance of the Moldova State University in Chişinău. In 1992, Anatol Ciobanu became a corresponding member of the Academy of Sciences of Moldova.

Awards
 Order of the Republic (Moldova)
 Doctor Honoris Cauza Alecu Russo State University of Bălți
 Lucrător Emerit al Şcolii Superioare  din R.S.S.M. şi din U.R.S.S.,
 Diploma de laureat pentru realizări în cercetare
 Diploma de Onoare a Universităţii de Stat din Moldova,
 Diploma de Excelenţă a Ambasadei României.
 Medalia „M. Eminescu”,
 Medalia „D. Cantemir”,
 Medalia „50 de  ani ai USM”

Works
 Părţile principale ale propoziţiei (1969);
 Probleme dificile de gramatică (1969);
  (1970);
 Синтаксис полусвязочных  глаголов (în 2 vol., 1976, 1978);
 Sintaxa propoziţiei (1976); Sintaxa frazei (1984);
 Sintaxa şi semantica (Studiu de lingvistică generală) (1987);
 Sintaxa (1987, în colab. şi red.);
 Limba maternă şi cultivarea ei (1988);
 Sintaxa practică (Cu elemente de analiză transformaţională) (1991);
 Limba latină: Manual pentru cl. a X-a (1995, în colab.);
  (1996, în colab.);
 Limba latină: Manual pentru cl. a XI-a (1999, în colab.);
 Punctuaţia limbii române (2000);
  (2002, în colab.);
 Limba latină: Manual pentru cl. a XII-a (2005, în colab.);
 Antologie filologică (2005, alc. şi coautor).

References

External links 
Omul care prezinta prin sine
Anatol Ciobanu
PROFESORUL ANATOL CIOBANU LA 70 DE ANI
Timpul
Timpul, Nicolae Roibu - „Suntem români şi punctum!”
Literatură şi artă

1934 births
2016 deaths
Moldova State University alumni
Moldovan writers
Moldovan male writers
Moldovan activists
People from Edineț District
Recipients of the Order of the Republic (Moldova)
Corresponding members of the Academy of Sciences of Moldova